Kashinath Shastri Appa Tulasi was an Indian musician and Sanskrit scholar.

Description 
In 1932 about 20 years after the publication of the text Swara-^mela-kalanidhi by Vishnu Narayan Bhatkhande in Bombay, Bhatkhande met Kashinath Shastri Appa Tulsi at Hyderabad. He explained the outline of the theory of music he had formed on the basis of the practice in vogue and Appa Tulsi at once took up the ideas and adopted them with intense and eager enjoyment. When Bhatkhande sent his Shree Mallakshya Sangeetam to him, Appa Tulsi composed 
his own couplets of the definitions of the various Ragas 
explained in Lakshya Sangeetam. He wrote three pamphlets in Sanskrit, namely Sangeet Sudhakar, Sangeet Kalpadrumankur and Raga Chandrika and one in Hindi namely Raga Chandrika Sar all on the basis of the definitions of Ragas given by Bhatkhande.

Manuscripts edited by Bhatkhande 
 Nartan Niranaya by Kashinath Shashtri Appa Tulsi
 Sangeet Sudhakar by Kashinath Shashtri Appa Tulsi
 Sangeet Kalp Drumankur by Kashinath Shashtri Appa Tulsi
 Raga Chandrika by Kashinath Shashtri Appa Tulsi
 Raga Chandrika Sar (Hindi)

Further reading

References

External links
 A biography of Bhatkhande

Indian music educators
Indian musicologists
Year of birth missing
Year of death missing